Shevils is a Norwegian hardcore band from Oslo, Norway. The band has produced three full-length albums, two of which are self-released. They have toured Norway extensively from south to north and playing Norway's big festivals such as Oyafestivalen and Trondheim Calling. Shevils last 3 releases were recorded, mixed and produced by Marcus Forsgren (Jaga Jazzist, The Lionheart Brothers, Silence the Foe & U-FOES).

Discography 
 The Year Of The Fly (Oslo Grammofon, 2011) LP
 Necropolis (Self-Released, 2012) EP
 Lost In Tartarus (Self-Released, 2013) LP
 The White Sea (Self-Released, 2015) LP
 The Miracle of the Sun (Self-Released, 2021) LP

The Year of the Fly (2011)
Shevils released its debut album The Year of the Fly in November 2011. The album was produced by Milton Von Krogh, of the Norwegian hard rock band Pirate Love, and David Husvik of Extol and Doctor Midnight & The Mercy Cult. Many guest vocalists were featured on the album including Ivar Nikolaisen (Silver), Silje Tombre (Blood Command) og Morten Øby (The Lionheart Brothers) as well as a guitar solo by Milton Von Krogh on To Wear A Whale.

Lost In Tartarus (2013)
The second full-length album for Shevils, Lost In Tartarus, was released two years after The Year of the Fly in November 2013 with the album art by Chris Faccone. The record caught the attention of many blogs and music news outlets and as a result gathered over 30 reviews of the album. The album also received radio play on Ruben, NRK Urørt and Pyro which named Shevils one of Norway's most promising bands in 2013. Singles from Lost In Tartarus A-listed on student radio in Bergen. and in Oslo. The band decided to release Lost In Tartarus independently so that it would get released as quickly as possible.

The White Sea (2015)
Deciding to go the self-released route once again, Shevils' third full-length release, The White Sea came in November 2015, again sporting another piece of album art by Chris Faccone. Once again The White Sea was noticed by blogs and music publications in Norway and worldwide. The White Sea was one of Metal Hammer Norway's top albums of 2015.

The Miracle of the Sun (2021)
Shevils released the album Miracle of the Sun on 7 May 2021, and has received praise and honour from a series of different magazines, websites and blogs, both in Norway and abroad. Some of the reviews include 8,5/10 in Scene Point Blank (Netherlands) https://www.scenepointblank.com/reviews/shevils/miracle-sun/, 20/20 in Eklektik Rock (France) https://www.eklektik-rock.com/2021/05/shevils-miracle-of-the-sun/, 9/10 in Musikknyheter.no (Norway) https://www.musikknyheter.no/anmeldelser/21421/Shevils.html, 8,5/10 i Metal Hammer Norway http://www.metalhammer.no/?p=14491, 8,5/10 in Riff Valley (Spain) https://www.riffvalley.es/cronicas/shevils-miracle-of-the-sun, and even reviews in Germany (Bierschinken) https://www.bierschinken.net/review/4408-shevils-miracle-of-the-sun, and The US (Tinnitist) https://tinnitist.com/2021/05/07/albums-of-the-week-shevils-miracle-of-the-sun/, (Average Music Blog) https://www.averagemusicblog.com/reviews/2021/5/17/shevils-drops-new-full-length-miracle-of-the-sun. The videos for the songs "Scandinavian Death Star" and "Monsters On TV" were published by Hardcore Worldwide on their youtube channel. https://www.youtube.com/watch?v=gz78yTPTdLE https://www.youtube.com/watch?v=54AV8M4Bn8M

Members

Present
Anders Voldrønning: vocals
Andreas Andre Myrvold: guitar
Anders Emil Rønning: drums
Johan Magnus Staxrud: bass, guitar

While there is only four official members of Shevils, other members make up the rest of the band when live shows are concerned.

Live
Andreas Engeseth: bass, guitar
Ole Torstein Hovig: synthesizer
Kristofer Staxrud: bass
Markus Lind Aase: guitar, bass
Torkil Rødvand: bass
Peter Rudolfsen: drums
Marcus Forsgren: bass, guitar

Past
Arnbjørn Joar Styrkor Marklund: bass
Kristofer Staxrud: drums
Christoffer Gaarder: guitar

References

External links
 Official website

Musical groups from Oslo
Norwegian musical trios
Musical groups established in 2010
2010 establishments in Norway
Norwegian hardcore punk groups